The 2011 World Allround Speed Skating Championships was held at the indoor ice rink of the Olympic Oval in Calgary, Alberta, (Canada) on 12 and 13 February 2011.

Women's championships 

Source: ISU results Women

Allround results 

NQ = Not qualified for the 5000 m (only the best 12 are qualified)
DQ = disqualified

Men's championships 

Source: ISU results Men

Allround results 

NQ = Not qualified for the 10000 m (only the best 12 are qualified)
DQ = disqualified

Rules 
All 24 participating skaters are allowed to skate the first three distances; 12 skaters may take part on the fourth distance. These 12 skaters are determined by taking the standings on the longest of the first three distances, as well as the samalog standings after three distances, and comparing these lists as follows:

 Skaters among the top 12 on both lists are qualified.
 To make up a total of 12, skaters are then added in order of their best rank on either list. Samalog standings take precedence over the longest-distance standings in the event of a tie.

References 

World Allround Speed Skating Championships, 2011
2011 World Allround
World Allround, 2011
Sport in Calgary